Bo Markus Karlsson (born 30 August 1972) is a Swedish former professional footballer who played as a defender.

Karlsson joined Djurgården from BKV Norrtälje for the 1996 season as a midfielder. He was captain of the very successful Djurgården squad that won back-to-back Swedish championships in 2002 and 2003, including the league-cup double in 2002.

He later played for Rot-Weiß Essen, Stabæk Fotball, IF Brommapojkarna and IFK Lidingö FK.

Career statistics

Honours 

 Djurgårdens IF
 Division 1 Norra: 1998
 Superettan: 2000
 Allsvenskan: 2002, 2003
 Svenska Cupen: 2002, 2004
Individual
 Årets Järnkamin: 2003

References

External links
 

1972 births
Living people
Djurgårdens IF Fotboll players
Rot-Weiss Essen players
Stabæk Fotball players
IF Brommapojkarna players
IFK Lidingö players
Swedish footballers
Swedish expatriate footballers
Allsvenskan players
Superettan players
2. Bundesliga players
Eliteserien players
Norwegian First Division players
Expatriate footballers in Germany
Swedish expatriate sportspeople in Germany
Expatriate footballers in Norway
Swedish expatriate sportspeople in Norway
Association football defenders